Alan Stewart Paton (11 January 1903 – 12 April 1988) was a South African writer and anti-apartheid activist. His works include the novels Cry, the Beloved Country, Too Late the Phalarope and the narrative poem The Wasteland.

Family
Paton was born in Pietermaritzburg in the Colony of Natal (now South Africa's KwaZulu-Natal province), the son of a civil servant (who was of  Christadelphian belief). After attending Maritzburg College, he earned a Bachelor of Science degree at the University of Natal in his hometown, followed by a diploma in education. After graduation, Paton worked as a teacher, first at the Ixopo High School, and subsequently at Maritzburg College. While at Ixopo he met Dorrie Francis Lusted. They married in 1928 and remained together until her death from emphysema in 1967. Their life together is documented in Paton's book Kontakion for You Departed, published in 1969. They had two sons, Jonathan and David.  In 1969, Paton married Anne Hopkins.  This marriage lasted until Paton's death.

Paton was a strong Christian. His faith was one of the reasons he was so strongly opposed to apartheid.

Early career
He served as the principal of Diepkloof Reformatory for young (native African) offenders from 1935 to 1949, where he introduced controversial "progressive" reforms, including policies on open dormitories, work permits, and home visitation. The men were initially housed in closed dormitories; once they had proven themselves trustworthy, they would be transferred to open dormitories within the compound. Men who showed great trustworthiness would be permitted to work outside the compound. In some cases, men were even permitted to reside outside the compound under the supervision of a care family. Fewer than 5% of the 10,000 men who were given home leave during Paton's years at Diepkloof ever broke their trust by failing to return.

Later career
Paton volunteered for military service with the British Commonwealth forces during World War II, but was refused by the South African authorities. After the war he took a journey, at his own expense, to tour correctional facilities across the world. He toured Scandinavia, Britain, continental Europe, Canada, and the United States. During his time in Norway, he began work on his seminal novel Cry, the Beloved Country, which he completed over the course of his journey, finishing it on Christmas Eve in San Francisco in 1946. There, he met Aubrey and Marigold Burns, who read his manuscript and found a publisher: the editor Maxwell Perkins, noted for editing novels of Ernest Hemingway and Thomas Wolfe, guided Paton's first novel through publication with Scribner's.

Paton published numerous books in the 1950s and became wealthy from their sales.

On 11 January 2018, a Google Doodle honored the author on what would have been his 115th birthday.

Opposition to apartheid
In 1948, four months after the publication of Cry, the Beloved Country, the right-wing National Party was elected in South Africa. Paton, together with Margaret Ballinger, Edgar Brookes, and Leo Marquard, formed the Liberal Association in early-1953. On 9 May 1953, it became the Liberal Party of South Africa, with Paton as a founding co-president, which fought against the apartheid laws introduced by the National Party government. He served as President of the LPSA until its forced dissolution by the government in the late 1960s, officially because its membership comprised both Blacks and Whites. Paton was a friend of Bernard Friedman, founder of the Progressive Party. Paton's writer colleague Laurens van der Post, who had moved to England in the 1930s, helped the party in many ways. The South African Secret Police were aware that van der Post was providing money to Paton and the LPSA, but they could not stop it by legal procedures. Paton himself advocated peaceful opposition to apartheid, as did many others in the party. Yet, some LPSA members took a more violent stance, and consequently some stigma attached to the party, not just within South Africa, but also outside the country. Paton's passport was confiscated by the South African government upon his return from New York in 1960, where he had been presented with the annual Freedom Award. It was not returned to him for ten years.

Paton retired to Botha's Hill, where he resided until his death. He is honored at the Hall of Freedom of the Liberal International organisation.

Other works
Cry, the Beloved Country has been filmed twice (in 1951 and 1995) and was the basis for the Broadway musical Lost in the Stars (adaptation by Maxwell Anderson, music by Kurt Weill). Paton's second and third novels, Too Late the Phalarope (1953) and Ah, but Your Land Is Beautiful (1981), and his short stories, Tales From a Troubled Land (1961), all deal with the same racial themes that concerned the author in his first novel. Ah, but Your Land Is Beautiful was built on parallel life stories, letters, speeches, news and records in legal proceedings, and mixed fictional and real-life characters, such as Donald Molteno, Albert Luthuli and Hendrik Verwoerd. The novel is categorised as historical fiction, as it gives an accurate account of the resistance movement in South Africa during the 1960s. "Paton attempts to imbue his characters with a humanity not expected of them. In this novel, for example, we meet the supposedly obdurate Afrikaner who contravenes the infamous Immorality Act. There are other Afrikaners, too, who are led by their consciences and not by rules, and regulations promulgated by a faceless, monolithic parliament."

Paton was a prolific essay writer on race and politics in South Africa. In Save the Beloved Country he plays on the famous title of his first novel, but keeps a serious tone in discussing many of the famous personalities and issues on different sides of South Africa's apartheid struggle. His Anglican faith was another factor in his life and work: the title of one work is Instrument of Thy Peace. Paton also wrote two autobiographies: Towards the Mountain deals with Paton's life leading up to and including the publication of Cry, the Beloved Country (an event that changed the course of his life) while Journey Continued takes its departure from that time onwards. He also wrote biographies of his friends Jan Hendrik Hofmeyr (Hofmeyr), and Geoffrey Clayton (Apartheid and the Archbishop). Another literary form that interested him throughout his life was poetry; the biographer Peter Alexander includes many of these poems in his biography of Paton.

Publications of Paton's work include a volume of his travel writing, The Lost City of the Kalahari (2006), and a complete selection of his shorter writings, The Hero of Currie Road.

The Alan Paton Award for non-fiction is conferred annually in his honour.

Selected works
 Cry, The Beloved Country, 1948 – made into a film in 1951, directed by Zoltan Korda with a screenplay by Paton himself; in 1995, directed by Darrell Roodt; also a musical and an opera
 Lost in the Stars 1950 – a musical based on the above work (book and lyrics by Maxwell Anderson, music by Kurt Weill)
 Too Late the Phalarope, 1953
 The Land and People of South Africa, 1955
 South Africa in Transition, 1956
 Debbie Go Home, 1960
 Tales from a Troubled Land, 1961
 Hofmeyr, 1964
 South African Tragedy, 1965
 Sponono, 1965 (with Krishna Shah)
 The Long View, 1967
 Instrument of Thy Peace, 1968
 Kontakion For You Departed, 1969 (also: For You Departed)
 D. C. S. Oosthuizen Memorial Lecture, 1970
 Case History of a Pinky, 1972
 Apartheid and the Archbishop: the Life and Times of Geoffrey Clayton, Archbishop of Cape Town, 1973
 Knocking on the Door, 1975
 Towards the Mountain, 1980
 Ah, but Your Land Is Beautiful, 1981
 Journey Continued: An Autobiography, 1988
 Save the Beloved Country, 1989
 The Hero of Currie Road: the complete short pieces, 2008

Awards and honours

 In 20 April 2006 he was posthumously awarded the Order of Ikhamanga in Gold "Exceptional contribution to literature, exposing the apartheid oppression through his work and fighting for a just and democratic society."

See also
 Liberalism
 Contributions to liberal theory
 List of African writers
 List of South Africans – In 2004 Paton was voted 59th in the SABC3's Great South Africans

Notes

Further reading
   116 pp.
 .
 Fullerton, Ian (1980), Politics and the South African Novel in English, in Murray, Glen (ed.), Cencrastus No. 3, Summer 1980, pp. 22 & 23

External links

 The Alan Paton Centre & Struggle Archives
 Alan Paton — A short biography and bibliography 
 A mixture of ice and fulfilled desire, Mail & Guardian, 14 November 2005

1903 births
1988 deaths
Anglican anti-apartheid activists
People from Pietermaritzburg
University of Natal alumni
South African Anglicans
South African male novelists
Anglican writers
Alumni of Maritzburg College
White South African anti-apartheid activists
Liberal Party of South Africa politicians
South African autobiographers
South African people of British descent
Recipients of the Order of Ikhamanga
20th-century South African novelists
20th-century South African historians
20th-century South African male writers
20th-century Anglicans